Min Min is a fictional character and one of the playable fighters from Nintendo EPD's 2017 fighting video game ARMS. She is depicted as a Chinese martial artist who fights with extendable arms that resemble noodles. Since her debut she has been considered one of the more popular characters from the game, with her popularity later leading to her inclusion as a playable character in Super Smash Bros. Ultimate.

Concept and creation 
Like most characters in ARMS, Min Min was designed first around a basic idea of what the developers wanted the fighters' arms to consist of, and then progressively iterating upon the concept. Min Min was created based on ramen; her hair resembles noodles and she sports a beanie hat resembling a ramen bowl. Her arms in their basic form resemble a spiraling shape of noodles, and feature pieces of narutomaki attached to her upper arms. In-game, when Min Min charges up her left arm, it transforms into a Chinese dragon. Her traditional attire consists of athletic wear and sneakers, with her shirt sporting the Chinese character for "noodle".

For the game's female cast, the team wanted to strike a balance between athleticism and femininity, designing characters with simple and easy-to-read expressions similar to that of an animated film, which the team believed would make the characters more relatable and instill a sense of familiarity. Art director Masaaki Ishikawa described Min Min as a female character that's not too cutesy and felt that her sporty outfit, ramen bowl inspired beanie, and dragon motif accessories contribute to her popularity. Min Min was designed to have clear definition in her legs which would accentuate her motions and give her a clear silhouette resembling that of professional athletes. Min Min, along with the rest of the cast in ARMS, is regarded as a protagonist of the game by its producer.

Appearances 
Min Min appears in ARMS as one of the  game's base roster characters. She is an 18-year old martial artist who is described as "Ramen Royalty" and enters the Grand Prix in order to promote her family restaurant, the Mintendo Noodle House. She also starred in the game's Party Crash Bash Championship, where she was crowned the ARMS champion.

Min Min is featured in Super Smash Bros. Ultimate as a Spirit, a form of collectible. In 2020 she was added to the game as a playable character, being the first piece of paid downloadable content as part of Fighters Pass Vol. 2. She was slated to receive an Amiibo in 2022, which was released on April 29 that year. Min Min was originally slated to appear in the cancelled ARMS graphic novel.

Reception 
Min Min has received mostly positive reception among fans and critics. In a pre-release ARMS poll  held by Nintendo Life, Min Min ranked second among fans' favorite fighters. Cecilia D'Anastasio of Kotaku praised the character, saying that "Min Min, with her beanie an upside-down ramen bowl and stringy, ramen arms, is ridiculous and amazing". David L. Craddock of Shacknews cited Min Min as his favorite ARMS character, drawing an analogy between her name and the term "min-max". Marcel Hoang of Destructoid described Min Min as his favorite character in ARMS, echoing fan praise for her character mechanics. Jordan Erica Webber of The Guardian was critical toward several designs in ARMS and felt Min Min's dragon-themed weapons and arms made out of noodles come across as an "uncomfortable stereotype". In June 2019, Nintendo celebrated ARMS’ 2nd anniversary and Min Min's victory of the games' final Party Crash Bash event with commemorative artwork of her, capturing the title as the best ARMS fighter. Cosplays for Min Min, alongside Spring Man and Ribbon Girl, have been highlighted during the 2017 Anime Expo.

Nintendo revealed the ARMS characters with highest win rates as of August 2017, placing Min Min at third. Prior to the release of Lola Pop, she was ranked as fourth in overall usage rates, below Ninjara, Kid Cobra, and Spring Man, as well as the number one used character in the game's ranked mode. Masaaki Ishikawa, the art director of ARMS, considers Min Min his favorite character in the game due to what he describes as "sharper features" compared to the rest of the cast, as well as finding her a relatable character. Game producer Kosuke Yabuki has also said that she is his favorite character in ARMS due to the ramen influenced embellishments on her design, as well as her asymmetric arms making her stand out among the rest of the cast mechanically and visually.

Masahiro Sakurai said that Min Min in Super Smash Bros. Ultimate was chosen as the representative of ARMS at the request of game producer Kosuke Yabuki, noting that the character was particularly difficult to integrate into the world of Ultimate, though they finally settled on what they believed to be an extraordinary fighting style. After her inclusion in Super Smash Bros., the ARMS developers celebrated with new artwork of Min Min. Chris Carter of Destructoid noted that Min Min's inclusion in Super Smash Bros. Ultimate might be "unwanted, but she fits in". Gavin Jasper of Den of Geek praised the control design of Min Min from Super Smash Bros. Ultimate, and how each fist can be controlled by a different button.  IGN'''s Suriel Vazquez concluded in her review for the character that "Min Min may not be the exciting third-party surprise or first-party favorite fans hoped would kick off Ultimate's second wave of DLC fighters, but she's just the kind of out-of-left-field concept I want from a new character." Comic Book Resources ranked Min Min as the third best Super Smash Bros. Ultimate DLC character, and also included her in a group of most underrated characters in the game. Bryce Johnson of Screen Rant ranked Min Min as the second best Super Smash Bros. Ultimate'' DLC character.

References

External links
Min Min on the official Nintendo website

Female characters in video games
Fictional martial artists in video games
Super Smash Bros. fighters
Video game characters introduced in 2017
Nintendo protagonists
Nintendo characters
Fictional restaurant staff
Woman soldier and warrior characters in video games